Red Cliff or Red Cliffs may refer to:

Chibi City, a city in Hubei, China; the name is translated as "Red Cliff(s)"
 Battle of Red Cliffs (208-209 AD), battle at the end of the Han Dynasty in China taking place in Chibi near modern Chibi City
 Red Cliff (Peking opera), a Peking opera play based on the Battle of Red Cliffs
 Red Cliff (film), 2008 Chinese film based on the Battle of Red Cliffs
 Red Cliff, Colorado, a town in the United States
 Red Cliff Bridge
 Red Cliff, East Riding of Yorkshire, boulder clay cliff on the Humber estuary bank, archaeological site
 Red Cliff, Greenland, Robert Peary's base  during his Second Greenland Expedition
 Red Cliffs, Victoria, a town in Victoria, Australia
 Red Cliff, Wisconsin, an unincorporated community in the United States
 Red Cliff Band of Lake Superior Chippewa, a band of Ojibwe Indians in Wisconsin
 Xin Zhan: Red Cliff, a 2008 EP by Tibetan-Chinese singer Alan Dawa Dolma

See also
Redcliff (disambiguation)
Rotes Kliff ("Red Cliff")